A Municipal election was held in Venice, Italy, on 20 and 21 September. It was originally scheduled to take place on May 31, 2020, but it was delayed due to the coronavirus pandemic in Italy.

Electoral system
The voting system is used for all mayoral elections in Italy, in the cities with a population higher than 15,000 inhabitants. Under this system, voters express a direct choice for the mayor or an indirect choice voting for the party of the candidate's coalition. If no candidate receives 50% of votes during the first round, the top two candidates go to a second round after two weeks. The winning candidate obtains a majority bonus equal to 60% of seats. During the first round, if no candidate gets more than 50% of votes but a coalition of lists gets the majority of 50% of votes or if the mayor is elected in the first round but its coalition gets less than 40% of the valid votes, the majority bonus cannot be assigned to the coalition of the winning mayor candidate.

The election of the City Council is based on a direct choice for the candidate with a maximum of two preferential votes, each for a different gender, belonging to the same party list: the candidate with the majority of the preferences is elected. The number of the seats for each party is determined proportionally, using D'Hondt seat allocation. Only coalitions with more than 3% of votes are eligible to get any seats.

Candidates

Parties and candidates
This is a list of the parties (and their respective leaders) which will participate in the election.

Opinion polls

Candidates

Parties

Results

See also
2020 Italian local elections

References

2020 elections in Italy
Venice
Venice
Elections in Veneto
September 2020 events in Italy
Venice municipal election 2020